Map of places in Renfrewshire compiled from this list
See the list of places in Scotland for places in other counties.

This is a list of towns and villages in the Renfrewshire council area of Scotland.

 

B
Bishopton 
Bridge of Weir 
Brookfield

C
Carruthmuir
Craigends
Crosslee

E
Elderslie
Erskine

H
Houston
Howwood

I
Inchinnan

J
Johnstone

K
Kilbarchan

L
Langbank
Linwood
Lochwinnoch

P
Paisley

W 
 Windy Hill

See also
List of places in Scotland

Renfrewshire
Geography of Renfrewshire
Lists of places in Scotland
Populated places in Scotland